Nikos Zachariadis (27 April 1903 – 1 August 1973) was the General Secretary of the Communist Party of Greece (KKE) from 1931 to 1956, and one of the most important personalities in the Greek Civil War.

Early life
Nikos Zachariadis was born in Edirne, Adrianople Vilayet, Ottoman Empire, in 1903, to an ethnic Greek family. His father, Panagiotis Zachariadis, was of petty-bourgeois origin and worked as an expert in the Regie Company, a French firm possessing the tobacco monopoly in Turkey.

In 1919, Nikos Zachariadis moved to Constantinople, where he worked in various jobs, including as a soldier. It was there that he carried out his first organized work in the working-class movement. After the defeat of Greece during the Greco-Turkish War and the population exchange between the two countries, the Zachariadis family was forcibly relocated to Greece and fell into poverty. In 1922 to 1923, he traveled to the Soviet Union, where he became a member of the Komsomol. He studied at various political and military institutions of the Soviet government and of the Communist International, including the International Lenin School.

Political activity in Greece
In 1923, he was sent back to Greece to organize the Young Communist League of Greece (OKNE). Imprisoned, he subsequently fled to the Soviet Union. In 1931, he was sent back to Greece to restore order in the highly-factionalised KKE. The same year, he was elected general secretary of KKE. In 1935, during the 7th Congress of the Communist International, he was elected to its Executive Committee. In the years until 1936, Zachariadis was a successful leader of the KKE by tripling the number of its members, gaining seats in the Greek Parliament and even acquiring control of some labour unions.

In August 1936, he was arrested by the State Security of Ioannis Metaxas's regime and was imprisoned. From prison, he issued a letter urging all Greeks to resist the Italian invasion of October 1940 and to transform the war into an antifascist war. Some KKE cadre members, who did not believe that the ongoing war between the big imperialist powers differed from the First World War because of the existence of the Soviet Union on the world scene, considered that the letter had been fabricated by the Metaxas regime. Zachariadis was even accused of releasing it to win the favour of Konstantinos Maniadakis and to be released from prison. Zachariadis's letter remains a cornerstone of the KKE's vital contribution to the National Resistance movement against the Fascist occupiers (1941-1944). 

After the German invasion of Greece in 1941, Nazi Germany transferred him to the Dachau concentration camp from where he was released in May 1945. Returning to Greece, he reassumed the leadership of the KKE from Georgios Siantos, the acting general secretary of the KKE since January 1942. The bloody Dekemvriana had just ended with the communists' defeat. Zachariadis now declared his political intention for the KKE to fight for people's democracy by elections.

Civil War
However, Zachariadis' plans changed. He attributed his change of stance to the White Terror. That made him decide to boycott the 1946 Greek legislative election, a starting point of the Greek Civil War (1946-1949).

Zachariadis conducted the military operations of the communist Democratic Army of Greece, which was formed to install a socialist people's democracy in Greece.

He ordered the ELAS commander Markos Vafiadis to abandon guerrilla warfare tactics and adopt a strategy of conventional warfare. According to Vafiadis, that had a strongly negative effect on ELAS. Vafiadis was expelled from the KKE for challenging Zachariadis and kept under house arrest in Albania, accused of being a British agent. During the Greek Civil War, Zachariadis ordered also the assassination of various left-wing opponents of the KKE, particularly in Athens.

However, Joseph Stalin had made a deal with the Western Allies that Greece would be considered part of the western sphere of influence after the war and was opposed officially to any communist seizure of power. He ordered the KKE leadership to co-operate with the British military when it landed in Greece in 1944 and refused to supply any assistance to the KKE when they took up arms against the royalist government imposed by the British.

Josip Broz Tito's Yugoslavia initially supported the KKE but withdrew the support after the break between Tito and Stalin in 1948. The military intervention of the United Kingdom and the United States, combined with the lack of external support from Stalin or Tito, led to the defeat of the Democratic Army of Greece in 1949. The KKE leadership and the remnants of the Democratic Army fled into exile to the Soviet Union and other communist countries.

Postwar
The leadership of the Communist Party found refuge in Tashkent. However, after Stalin's death in 1953, Zachariadis clashed with the new Soviet leadership, as he opposed the new direction taken by the Soviet Communist Party under Nikita Khrushchev.

In May 1956, during the Sixth Plenum of the Central Committee of the KKE, the Soviet Communist Party intervened to expel Zachariadis from his post of General Secretary. In February 1957, Zachariadis was also expelled from the KKE, as were many of his supporters.

Zachariadis spent the rest of his life in exile in Siberia, initially in Yakutia and later in Surgut, Russian SFSR. In 1962, desperate from the devastating conditions of his exile, he somehow managed to reach Moscow. There, he visited the Greek Embassy and asked to be transported to Greece, where he wanted to stand trial for his actions. Whether or not his request was taken into consideration is not known. Immediately after he left the Greek embassy, he was arrested by the Soviets and was taken back to Surgut. There he committed suicide, aged 70, in 1973. According to a few of his followers, he was executed. On the base of documents, declassified from the archives of the Russian Ministry of Internal Affairs, it has been confirmed that Zachariadis committed suicide.

In December 1991, just a few days after the fall of the Soviet Union, Zachariadis' remains were returned to his homeland of Greece, and he was given a funeral, which gave his supporters the opportunity to honour him. He is buried in the First Cemetery of Athens.

In 2011, a National Conference of the Communist Party of Greece fully rehabilitated Zachariadis as General Secretary of the KKE. That was in line with the KKE's general political reorientation since the collapse of the Soviet Union; the party has adopted the view that the Soviet Communist Party of the Soviet Union embarked on a revisionist line after Stalin's death and Khrushchev's takeover.

References

External links
Nikos Zachariadis Archive at marxists.org
Collected works of Nikos Zachariadis

1903 births
1973 deaths
1973 suicides
20th-century Greek politicians
20th-century people from the Ottoman Empire
People from Edirne
People from Adrianople vilayet
Greek atheists
General Secretaries of the Communist Party of Greece
Stalinism
Anti-revisionists
International Lenin School alumni
Dachau concentration camp survivors
Democratic Army of Greece personnel
Exiles of the Greek Civil War in the Soviet Union
Suicides in the Soviet Union
Burials in Athens